Battle or Siege of Wesenberg, Rakvere, or Rakovor may refer to
Battle of Wesenberg (1268)
Siege of Wesenberg (1574)
Battle of Wesenberg (1581)
Battle of Wesenberg (1603)
Battle of Wesenberg (1704)

Rakvere